Fighter Squadron 191 (VF-191) was an aviation unit of the United States Navy. It was established in 1943 and disestablished in 1978. The squadron was nicknamed Satan's Kittens. A second VF-191, bearing the same designation and nickname was established for a short time again between 1986 and 1988.

History

VF-191 was established as fighter squadron VF-19 on 15 August 1943. On 15 November 1946 it was re-designated VF-19A. On 24 August 1948 it was finally re-designated VF-191 and adopted the new nickname Satan's Kittens. It was disestablished on 1 March 1978.

The squadron took part in World War II, the Korean War and the Vietnam War. During the latter conflict the squadron took part in several combat cruises, flying variants of the F-8 Crusader. After Vietnam VF-191 continued operations with the F-8 until 1976, when they transitioned to the F-4 Phantom II. A single cruise in the F-4 followed, as VF-191 was disestablished in 1978.

Deployments

See also

VF-191 (1986-8)
History of the United States Navy
List of inactive United States Navy aircraft squadrons
List of United States Navy aircraft squadrons

References

Deployments of USN fighter squadrons
VF-191 History
VF-191 Satan's Kittens

Strike fighter squadrons of the United States Navy